These are the Australian number-one albums of 2004, per the ARIA Charts.

See also
2004 in music
List of number-one singles in Australia in 2004

References

2004
Australia albums
2004 in Australian music